A local people's court is a court at local level of the People's Republic of China. According to the Organic Law of the People's Courts, the local people's courts includes:
 High people's courts
 Intermediate people's courts
 Primary people's courts

During the 1940s and 1950s, people's courts were village meetings in which peasants would engage in airing grievances about their landlords. These were known as 诉苦会 sùkǔhuì “speak bitterness meetings” and were often organized by Communist militants for the denunciation of landlords. They have been described as a form of kangaroo court.

See also 

 Judicial system of China
 Court of special jurisdiction

References 

Judiciary of China